Ta Paet railway station is a railway station located in Pak Bang Subdistrict, Thepha District, Songkhla. On 19 May 2015, a bomb planted by separatists exploded near Ta Paet railway station, injuring two military volunteers, who were sent to Thepha Hospital afterwards. The event was part of the South Thailand Insurgency.

Services 
 Local No. 447/448 Surat Thani-Sungai Kolok-Surat Thani
 Local No. 451/452 Nakhon Si Thammarat-Sungai Kolok-Nakhon Si Thammarat
 Local No. 455/456 Nakhon Si Thammarat-Yala-Nakhon Si Thammarat
 Local No. 463/464 Phatthalung-Sungai Kolok-Phatthalung

References 

 
 

Railway stations in Thailand